Union Sportive Lesquin is a French association football team founded in 1920. They are based in Lesquin, Nord-Pas-de-Calais, France and are currently playing in the Championnat de France Amateurs Group A. They play at the Stade Jean-Pierre Papin in Lesquin, which has a capacity of 1,500.

External links
 US Lesquin Official Website

Football clubs in France
Association football clubs established in 1920
1920 establishments in France
Sport in Nord (French department)
Football clubs in Hauts-de-France